Daniel Freund (born 14 October 1984 in Aachen) is a German politician who has been serving as a member of the European Parliament since July 2019. He is a member of the Alliance 90/The Greens (German: Bündnis 90/Die Grünen or Grüne) at the national level and sits with the Group of the Greens/European Free Alliance in the European Parliament.

Early life and education 
Freund was born and raised in Germany and earned a graduate degree in political science, economics, and law from Leipzig University. He received a master's degree in public affairs from the Institute of Political Studies, Paris, and during his studies there he also studied at the Elliott School of George Washington University. While studying, Freund and like-minded activists formed the European newspaper project called the European Daily, which was the national winner of and nominee for the European Charlemagne Youth Prize.

Early career 
After working as an intern at Germany's Federal Foreign Office and the EU Delegation in Hong Kong and as a consultant for Deloitte, Freund worked in the office of MEP Gerald Häfner in Brussels from 2013 to 2014. From July 2014 to May 2019, Freund worked for Transparency International's Brussels office, where he was head of advocacy for EU integrity.

Political career

Early beginnings
In 2005, Freund joined the political party the Alliance 90/The Greens. From 2013 to 2019, he became active in the party's working group on European affairs as a coopted member and later as deputy spokesperson and cooptee of the German Association for European Affairs.

Member of the European Parliament, 2019–present 
During his party's federal congress in November 2018 in Leipzig, Freund was elected to the 20th position on its list for the European Parliament elections of 2019. His party, which is a member of the Greens / EFA Group, won 20.5% of the votes in the elections (21 of the 96 German mandates).

Freund is a member of the Committee on Budgetary Control and the Committee on Constitutional Affairs. In these capacities, he has served as his parliamentary group's rapporteur on a 2020 plan that linked member states’ access to the budget of the European Union to respect of the rule of law. In the Committee on Constitutional Affairs, he is the coordinator for the Greens/EFA group and a member of the Working Group on the Conference on the Future of Europe. In 2022, he also joined the Special Committee on foreign interference in all democratic processes in the European Union. Freund is also a deputy member of the Committee on Transport and Tourism.

Freund has been working on the establishment of an independent ethics body to track and sanction conflicts of interests in all EU institutions. On 16 September 2021, the European Parliament adopted the report on "Improving transparency and integrity in the EU institutions through the establishment of an independent EU ethics body". This proposal by Freund in his role of rapporteur passed by 377 to 87 votes, with 224 abstentions. Greens/EFA, Socialists, Liberals (Renew), and Left voted in favor. The Christian Democrats decided to abstain shortly before the German federal election instead of rejecting the draft as they had previously done in the vote in the Constitutional Affairs Committee. 

In addition to his committee assignments, Freund is part of the parliament's delegation to the EU-Montenegro Stabilisation and Association Parliamentary Committee. He co-chairs the European Parliament Intergroup on Anti-Corruption (alongside Roberta Metsola) and is a member of the European Parliament Intergroup on LGBT Rights. Since 2021, he has also been chairing the Spinelli Group.

In the negotiations to form a coalition government of the Christian Democratic Union (CDU) and the Green Party under Minister-President of North Rhine-Westphalia Hendrik Wüst following the 2022 state elections, Freund was part of his party’s delegation in the working group on cultural affairs, media, democracy and sports.

External links 
 danielfreund.eu, personal website as a member of the Greens/European Free Alliance (in German)
 Daniel Freund, Group of the Greens/European Free Alliance, Member, on the European Parliament's website europarl.europa.eu
 transparency.eu/author/daniel-freund Daniel Freund's page at transparency.eu
 @daniel_freund Daniel Freund on Twitter

References 

Alliance 90/The Greens MEPs
People from Aachen
1984 births
Elliott School of International Affairs alumni
Leipzig University alumni
Sciences Po alumni
MEPs for Germany 2019–2024
Living people
German expatriates in France